Segolame Boy (born 7 November 1992) is a Motswana midfielder playing for Township Rollers in the Botswana Premier League.

Segolame Boy was first spotted representing a Selibe-Phikwe local side in the constituency tournaments, the lowest level of Botswana football. Having impressed talent scouts, he was signed by Serowe-based club Miscellaneous and would spend two seasons with them plying his trade in the Botswana Premier League. In 2014 he moved to Premier League giants Township Rollers and quickly became a mainstay in their first eleven, even attracting attention from the more lucrative South African Premier Division. In just five years with the Gaborone club Boy won four Premier Leagues, a Mascom Top 8 Cup and was part of the history-making Rollers squad which played in the 2018 CAF Champions League group stage, cementing his name in Rollers folklore.

International career
Boy made his Botswana debut aged 21 in 2014 under then coach Peter Butler (footballer, born 1966). Deployed as an attacking midfielder behind the strikers, he played the entire game as the Zebras lost 2-0 to Senegal in a 2015 AFCON qualifier.

Honours

Club
 Township Rollers
Botswana Premier League:4
2015-16, 2016-17, 2017-18, 2018-19
Mascom Top 8 Cup:1
2017-18

Individual
FUB Team of the Year: 2016

References

1992 births
Living people
Botswana footballers
Botswana international footballers
Township Rollers F.C. players
Association football midfielders